Fun Machine is an EP by Lake Street Dive, released in 2012. It reached number 15 on the Top Heatseekers chart.

Reception

Writing for Allmusic, music critic Matt Collar wrote of the album "This is buoyant, fun music that combines the group's jazz, pop, and R&B influences and showcases frontwoman Rachael Price's resonant, soulful vocals."

Track listing
"Faith" (George Michael) – 3:37
"Clear a Space" (Rachael Price, Tom Price) – 4:00
"I Want You Back" (Berry Gordy, Freddie Perren, Alphonzo Mizell, Deke Richards) – 4:19
"Rich Girl" (Daryl Hall) – 3:37
"This Magic Moment" (Doc Pomus, Mort Shuman) – 2:48
"Let Me Roll It" (Paul McCartney, Linda McCartney) – 3:42

Personnel
Rachael Price – lead vocals
Mike “McDuck” Olson – guitar, trumpet, vocals
Bridget Kearney – bass, vocals
Mike Calabrese – drums, percussion, vocals
Daniel Clarke – keyboards

Technical personnel
Joe Bass – producer
Stuart Myers– mixing
Joe Lambert – mastering

Design
Robin Hayashi – design
Deidre Schoo – photography

Charts

References

2012 albums
Lake Street Dive albums